The Allegheny River Islands Wilderness is located in the Allegheny National Forest.  It comprises seven islands in the Allegheny River, totaling . All are alluvial origin. The islands are located between Buckaloons Recreation Area and Tionesta, Pennsylvania. 

The Allegheny River Islands Wilderness was created by Congress in 1984 as part of the National Wilderness Preservation System.  It is one of the smallest wilderness areas of the United States.

Flora
These islands are characterized by river bottom forest types such as willows, American sycamore, shagbark hickory, green ash, and silver maple.  Crull's and Thompson's Island contain  of mature and old-growth forests.

Fauna
Bald eagles have returned to the area, and otters have been re-introduced.  The area is home to ospreys, soft-shelled turtles, great blue herons, kingfishers, common mergansers, mallards, and beavers.

The Allegheny River is home to a variety of freshwater mussels.

The islands are home to the federally endangered clubshell mussel (Pleurobema clava) and the Northern riffleshell (Epioblasma torulosa rangiana).

They are also home to rare fishes, including the bluebreast darter (Etheostoma camurum), and the spotted darter (Etheostoma maculatum).

List of Islands
 Crull's Island
 Thompson's Island
 R. Thompson's Island
 Courson Island
 King's Islands
 Baker Islands
 No-Name Island

In popular culture
The area was featured in "Brian Finch's Black Op," the November 3, 2015 episode of Limitless.

See also
 List of U.S. Wilderness Areas
 Wilderness Act

References

 Nature Tourism
 Middle Allegheny River Water Trail
 Wilderness Islands Water Trail

External links
 Friends of Allegheny Wilderness

 
IUCN Category Ib
Protected areas of Forest County, Pennsylvania
Protected areas of Warren County, Pennsylvania
Allegheny National Forest